Edward Lynam O'Brien (born 7 May 1974) is an Australian politician. He is a member of the Liberal National Party of Queensland (LNP) and has represented the seat of Fairfax in the House of Representatives since the 2016 federal election. He sits with the Liberal Party in federal parliament. Prior to entering politics he was a businessman with considerable experience across Asia and a leader of various community organisations, including chairman of the Australian Republic Movement (2005–2007).

Early life
O'Brien was born in Brisbane, Queensland. He is the youngest of nine children and one of seven sons born to Tom and Bernice O'Brien. His father's family were the founders of the Defiance Flour Mill in Toowoomba. The mill evolved into "a well-known Queensland business dynasty in flour manufacturing" and O'Brien's first job was as a trainee baker.

O'Brien holds degrees from the University of Queensland (Bachelor of Arts), London School of Economics (Master of Economics) and University of Melbourne (Master of Business Administration), and he studied Chinese Mandarin at the National Taiwan Normal University under an Asia Pacific Fellowship.

Career
Before entering politics O'Brien worked overseas for an extended period in business development roles. He lived in China, Taiwan and Hong Kong for periods. O'Brien's first roles were with Defiance International, an offshoot of his family company, and he later worked with the Australian Ricegrowers' Cooperative and with Accenture, where he worked for over a decade, including Director of Growth and Strategy for the Asia Pacific and Emerging Markets, based out of Beijing. After returning to Australia he became the Queensland managing director of lobbying firm Barton Deakin. In 2014 he established his own consultancy firm, Ted O'Brien & Associates.

O'Brien served as chairman of the Australian Republican Movement from 2005 to 2007. During his tenure the organisation shifted its headquarters from Sydney to Canberra. It was reported that he and the national executive would "concentrate their Canberra lobbying on Coalition MPs, who are essential to any political move to revisit the question of a republic". O'Brien also served as chairman of the South-East Queensland branch of Ronald McDonald House Charities and on the board of the Queensland Catholic Education Advisory Board.

Politics

Early candidacies
O'Brien first ran for parliament at the 2007 federal election, losing to the incumbent Australian Labor Party (ALP) member Arch Bevis in the Division of Brisbane. He campaigned on the slogan "Time for Ted". O'Brien was the chairman of the Liberal National Party Futures Committee from 2011 to 2013. In November 2012, he won LNP preselection for the Division of Fairfax, defeating former national rugby coach John Connolly. He faced a high-profile challenger at the 2013 federal election, with mining magnate Clive Palmer contesting Fairfax as the leader of his Palmer United Party. Following a recount, Palmer defeated O'Brien by 53 votes on the two-candidate-preferred vote.

Federal politics
In May 2015, O'Brien again won LNP preselection for Fairfax. It was initially expected that Palmer would seek re-election in the same seat, but he eventually decided to leave federal politics. O'Brien subsequently regained Fairfax for the LNP at the 2016 federal election.

O'Brien has served on a number of House of Representatives committees, including as chair of the Standing Committee on Environment and Energy from July 2019, a member of the Joint Standing Committee on Foreign Affairs, Defence and trade, and Chair of the Trade Sub-Committee. In 2019 he was nominated to represent the Morrison Government on the Olympic Candidature Leadership Group overseeing South-East Queensland's prospective bid for the 2032 Summer Olympics.

Political views
O'Brien is an advocate of nuclear power. In 2019 he chaired a parliamentary inquiry into nuclear energy.

In September 2020, O'Brien called for Australia to negotiate a free-trade agreement with Taiwan, citing similar agreements with New Zealand and Singapore.

References

Liberal National Party of Queensland members of the Parliament of Australia
Members of the Australian House of Representatives
Members of the Australian House of Representatives for Fairfax
1974 births
Living people
21st-century Australian politicians
Alumni of the London School of Economics
University of Melbourne alumni
Australian republicans
Australian lobbyists
University of Queensland alumni
People from Brisbane